The Day's catfish (Nedystoma dayi) is a species of catfish in the family Ariidae. It was described by Edward Pierson Ramsay and James Douglas Ogilby in 1886, originally under the genus Hemipimelodus. It inhabits turbid freshwater rivers in New Guinea. Its diet consists of the larvae of aquatic insects.

References

Ariidae
Fish described in 1886